"We Made It" is a song by English singer and songwriter Louis Tomlinson, and the third single from his debut studio album Walls. It was released on 24 October 2019, with the music video being released the same day.

Background
Tomlinson wrote the track in 2017, and teased it in February 2018. While there are parts of the track that concern Tomlinson "struggl[ing] to find [his] place" in the early days of being part of One Direction, most of the track was written about his relationship with his girlfriend Eleanor Calder as well as his fans, with Tomlinson remarking that the "sentiment of the chorus" is a "message to them".

Critical reception
Claire Shaffer of Rolling Stone described the song as "Britpop-tinged", with lyrics that feature "Tomlinson reflecting on a struggling relationship, [and] expressing pride in how they've made it through the hardships". Writing for MTV, Patrick Hosken said that Tomlinson sings "some of his most personal lyrics yet" on the track. Lilly Pace of Billboard called Tomlinson's single "a combined love letter to his girlfriend and thank you to fans" and described his performance on The Late Late Show with James Corden as "angelic".

Music video
Tomlinson filmed the music video for the single with director Charlie Lightening at an English seaside arcade and boardwalk. It was released on 24 October along with the song, and features Tomlinson singing while a couple "overcome an obstacle" in their relationship, "set to a backdrop of summer-romance imagery". Tomlinson called it a "more cinematic" video than that of his previous single, "Kill My Mind".

Live performances
Tomlinson performed the song for the first time on The Late Late Show with James Corden on 28 October 2019. On 15 November 2019 he performed the song on BBC Children in Need.

Charts

Release history

References

2019 songs
2019 singles
Louis Tomlinson songs
Songs written by John Ryan (musician)
Songs written by Julian Bunetta
Songs written by Louis Tomlinson